3-Chlorobenzoic acid is an organic compound with the molecular formula ClC6H4CO2H.  It is a white solid that is soluble in some organic solvents and in aqueous base.

Synthesis and occurrence
3-Chlorobenzoic acid is prepared by oxidation of 3-chlorotoluene.

It is a metabolic byproduct of the drug bupropion.

References

Benzoic acids
Chlorobenzenes
Human drug metabolites